Allegra
is a female given name of Italian origin meaning joyful (happy) or lively. Allegra can refer to:

Allegra Byron (1817–1822), the illegitimate daughter of British Romantic poet George Gordon, Lord Byron and Claire Clairmont, the stepsister of Mary Shelley
Allegra Collins (born 1972), American attorney, educator and judge
Allegra Curtis (born 1966), American actress
Allegra Fuller Snyder, American film director and dance ethnographer; daughter of R. Buckminster Fuller
Allegra Goodman, American author
Allegra Huston, author
Allegra Kent, American ballet dancer
Allegra McEvedy, British chef
Allegra Versace (born 1986), heiress to the fashion house Versace
Allegra Spender, Australian businesswoman and politician
Allegra Stratton (born 1980), British journalist

Fictional characters
Allegra (comics)
 Allegra, the main character on the 1994–1996 Nick Jr. television series Allegra's Window 
Allegra Coleman, fictitious celebrity
 Allegra Geller, fictional character in the 1999 film eXistenZ
 Allegra Zane, fictional character in the 2002 television series Galidor: Defenders of the Outer Dimension
 Allegra Pazzi, fictional character in the 2001 film Hannibal
 Allegra Cole, fictional character in the 2005 film Hitch (film)
Allegra Sacrimoni, a fictional character in the HBO series The Sopranos
Allegra Garcia, a fictional DC Comics character

References

Italian feminine given names